Chris Green (born 7 September 1943) is a British railway manager. He has a reputation for the adoption of business-led management of passenger services both in the British Rail and privatised eras, and has been described as "the best chairman BR never had".

Early life
Green was born in Winchester and educated at St Paul's School, London and Oriel College, Oxford (where he read History).

Railway career

Early career
Green began his career in 1965 as a trainee manager with British Rail in the West Midlands, becoming area manager at Hull in 1973.

Senior management
In 1984 Green became manager of ScotRail, building its new identity.

In January 1986 he became BR Sector Director, London & South East. In April he announced that Marylebone station in central London would be reprieved from closure, and in June he launched Network SouthEast to unify London suburban rail services.  In October 1989 Green briefly appeared on BBC Challenge Anneka in an episode covering the re-opening of Northiam railway station.

At the beginning of 1992 he was appointed managing director of the InterCity sector, with a remit to create a new integrated and profitable business (from that April) which he achieved with a particular emphasis on customer service.

Heritage interlude
Owing to an interest in the built heritage in 1995 Green became chief executive of English Heritage.  He resigned from this post after 14 months having breached rules on the proper conduct of public business, described in an auditor's report as relatively minor matters and not amounting to fraud. He then became a director of consultants Gibb Rail and an advisor to the Transport Select Committee of the House of Commons. In 1995 he was appointed a board member of Eurotunnel.

Return to the mainline rail industry
In 1999 Green was invited back into active rail industry management as chief executive of Virgin Rail Group on a five-year contract with a twofold mission – to deliver a markedly improved service on the existing network and ensure the £1.8bn worth of new Class 390 Pendolino, Class 220 Voyager and Class 221 Super Voyager trains would be delivered on time. He also served as non-executive chairman of Virgin Rail Group Holdings in 2004/05.

From 2005 to 2010 he was a non-executive director of Network Rail.

Green has also served as a non-executive director of Connex Rail; chairman of The Railway Forum, 2005–2006; an advisory board member of Cranfield University; and a trustee of the Royal Liverpool Philharmonic Orchestra.

Since 2012 he has been a Vice President of the advocacy group Railfuture, having been appointed at the same time as his peer Adrian Shooter.

Books
He has co-authored two books; one about Network SouthEast and one about InterCity.

References

1943 births
Living people
Alumni of Oriel College, Oxford
British Rail people
English Heritage
People educated at St Paul's School, London
Businesspeople from Winchester
Virgin Trains